Destination Brooklyn is the only studio album by American hip hop artist Vicious, which was released on November 1, 1994, on Epic Records. A variety of producers contributed to the album, including Clark Kent, Salaam Remi and Vicious's mentor Doug E. Fresh. The album consisted mainly of reggae fusion, a blend of reggae and hip hop.

The album found some success on the Billboard charts, reaching the top 40 on both the Top R&B/Hip-Hop Albums and Top Heatseekers. It found its greatest success on the Top Reggae Albums chart, on which it peaked at number one. The album also spawned the single "Nika," which went to peak at 69 on the Billboard Hot 100 and nine on the Billboard Hot Rap Singles chart.

French Montana and Nicki Minaj sampled the hook from "Freaks" from their 2013 single of the same name.

Track listing

Charts

1994 debut albums
Albums produced by Clark Kent (producer)
Albums produced by Howie Tee
Albums produced by Salaam Remi
Epic Records albums